The Beijing–Kowloon through train was an intercity railway service between Hung Hom station (formerly Kowloon station until 1998) in Hong Kong and the Beijing West railway station in China, jointly operated by the MTRC of Hong Kong and China Railway, China's national rail service. The train ran to Beijing and Hong Kong every other day. Services used the East Rail line in Hong Kong, crossed the boundary between Hong Kong and mainland China at Lo Wu and then continued along China's railway network via the Guangshen railway and the Jingguang railway to Beijing. Total journey time was approximately 23 hours, and the train uses 25T class train carriages.

From 28 December 2017, travellers of selected nationalities are able to utilise the 144-hour transit when travelling on this line to or from Beijing, providing that they clear immigration in Beijing.

Due to the COVID-19 pandemic, the service had been suspended indefinitely since 30 January 2020. There is no plan to resume the service.

Carriages
The train operated in two parts, where 11 carriages would depart Hong Kong (travelling under number T97B from Beijing and T98B from Hong Kong) with an additional 8 carriages added at Guangzhou East railway station (using number Z97A/Z98A), totalling 19 carriages. Along the route, trains stopped at Changsha, Wuhan and Zhengzhou, though only passengers travelling from Guangzhou might disembark due to customs and immigration reasons.

The Hong Kong to Beijing section of the train was divided into three distinct classes – hard sleeper, soft sleeper and luxury soft sleeper (catering only to two persons, with better furnishing and private lavatories). The Guangzhou to Beijing section of the train only had hard sleepers and hard seats.

Dining services were provided by the Guangshen Railway Company. Passengers may choose to buy from carts which are pushed throughout the train at different intervals, or choose to dine in the dining car. The dining car provided a selection of light refreshments, along with two sets of menus (one for breakfast, and one for lunch/dinner) providing a range of cooked, a la carte dishes.

Locomotives
The train changed locomotives once on the way.

Operation

Ticketing
Beijing-bound passengers from Hong Kong could order tickets from an online reservation system operated by the MTR Corporation. The system was limited to the one-way, Hong Kong to Beijing trips only. Ordering of tickets required extensive registration, including a credit card number, and tickets could only be delivered in the Hong Kong SAR, which made it impossible for most non-HK resident customers to order. Travellers for Beijing may purchase northbound tickets at a dedicated counter at Hung Hom station, whilst southbound tickets from Beijing to Hong Kong coild only be purchased in Beijing or from travel agencies.

Service
Passengers departing from or arriving at Hong Kong could embark or disembark from platforms 5 or 6 of Hung Hom Station, which was restricted to intercity operations. Prior to boarding, passengers must go through Hong Kong immigration counters and cannot exit the restricted area.

Trains used platform 1 of Beijing West railway station, which was connected to the check hall for this particular through train service. Passengers coming from or going to Hong Kong clear Chinese immigration and customs in the hall. The part of the platform between the hall and the passenger cars for Hong Kong is cordoned off 

Trains operate from either terminating stations on an alternate schedule, under the following timetable:

See also
 Guangzhou–Shenzhen railway
 MTR
 Beijing–Guangzhou–Shenzhen–Hong Kong high-speed railway
 Shanghai–Kowloon through train
 Jingguang Railway
 Jingjiu Railway

References

External links 
 MTRC intercity passenger services

Z
Passenger rail transport in Hong Kong
Rail transport in Beijing
MTR